Matthew Rowell is a defender. He plays for Ajax Cape Town in the South African Premier Soccer League.

References

Living people
1993 births
Association football defenders
South African soccer players
Santos F.C. (South Africa) players